Aiden John McGeady (born 4 April 1986) is a professional footballer who plays as a winger for Scottish Premiership club Hibernian. Born in Scotland, he represented the Republic of Ireland national team from 2004 until 2017.

He started his career at Scottish Premier League club Celtic – with whom he won four league titles, two Scottish Cups and one Scottish League Cup – before moving to Russian club Spartak Moscow in 2010. In Russia, McGeady was a runner-up in the Russian Premier League. He moved to English football with Everton in January 2014, being loaned to Sheffield Wednesday and Preston North End before joining Sunderland in summer 2017. After five years with Sunderland he signed for Hibernian in June 2022.
 
McGeady was born and brought up in Scotland but chose to play for the Republic of Ireland national team, qualifying through his Irish grandparents. He was included in the Irish squads at UEFA Euro 2012 and UEFA Euro 2016, and made 93 full international appearances between 2004 and 2017.

Early life
McGeady was born in Rutherglen, Scotland. He attended Trinity High School (Rutherglen) for a short period of time before attending St Ninian's High School, Giffnock.

His father, John McGeady, was also a professional footballer for Sheffield United.

Club career

Celtic 

McGeady began his career with Queen's Park, having played as a child with a local youth team, Busby Boys Club. After several trials with clubs in England, including several visits to Arsenal, he joined Celtic while still in his early teens. He progressed through the academy alongside Charlie Mulgrew, playing with the youth and reserve teams, and won the Scottish Youth Cup in 2003.

His senior debut was on 24 April 2004 aged 18 in a league game against Hearts at Tynecastle late in the 2003–04 season. He started the match and scored a goal after 17 minutes, and finished that season with four league appearances as Celtic won the league. He made his UEFA Champions League debut the next season in a game against Italian side AC Milan and made the breakthrough into the first-team that same season, with 27 appearances in the league as Celtic finished runners-up in Martin O'Neill's final campaign with the club. He also featured as a late substitute in the season's Scottish Cup Final in which Celtic defeated Dundee United 1–0.

McGeady's 2005–06 season was hampered by a persistent knee injury and he struggled to secure a starting place ahead of Shaun Maloney and Shunsuke Nakamura, but still managed to make 19 appearances over the course of the season as Celtic won the league title.

The 2006–07 season saw Maloney leave Celtic for Aston Villa in January 2007, giving McGeady an opportunity to secure a regular starting place. He played regularly from that point in the Celtic team that again won the SPL championship and also qualified for the knockout stage of the Champions League for the first time in club history, defeating Manchester United, Benfica and Copenhagen in the group stage before losing 1–0 to eventual champions AC Milan in extra time. McGeady also started the 2007 Scottish Cup Final victory over Dunfermline Athletic.

The 2007–08 season was McGeady's annus mirabilis, earning him praise from the media, fans and fellow players. One of his most memorable performances came against Aberdeen, scoring a goal and setting up three, including a second goal for striker Scott McDonald with a 360-degree turn and cross. He continued to provide goals for his team, most importantly McDonald's equalising goal against rivals Rangers, a match that Celtic went on to win 3–2 which proved to be crucial in Celtic's successful defence of their title. Throughout the season, he contributed a total of eight goals and 24 assists and was awarded the SPFA Player of the Year and Young Player of the Year on 20 April 2008, only the second player ever to receive both awards in the same season (the first was Shaun Maloney in 2006), as voted by his fellow players. The club reached the knockout stages of the Champions League for a second consecutive season and won the league title for the third year in a row, overhauling Rangers with one week left and winning at Dundee United on the final day of the season to clinch the trophy.

McGeady entered in 2008–09 as Celtic's star player but his performances suffered as Celtic endured a poor second half to the season. On 16 December 2008, after a much-publicised dressing room row with manager Gordon Strachan, McGeady was fined two weeks' wages and suspended for two matches, although Strachan later denied any fall-out between him and McGeady. Although they won the 2009 Scottish League Cup Final,
with McGeady one of the scorers, Celtic finished runners-up to Rangers on the final day of the season and Strachan resigned soon after.

2009–10 began well for McGeady as he scored two goals against Aberdeen on the opening day of the season. Under new manager Tony Mowbray, the team's form was poor for much of the campaign, which led to Mowbray being sacked in March. McGeady's form improved, staying injury-free while contributing seven goals and 16 assists in 35 league appearances. Former teammate Neil Lennon took over as interim manager after Mowbray's departure. Ross County knocked Celtic out of the Scottish Cup and Celtic ended the season trophyless for the first time since 2003, having finished in second place in the SPL.

Spartak Moscow 

In August 2010, McGeady joined Russian side Spartak Moscow signing a four-and-half-year contract. The fee of £9.5 million made McGeady the most expensive export from Scottish football. He made his league debut in September, a 2–1 win against Saturn. He scored his first goal for Spartak in a 2–2 draw at home to Amkar later the same month. In the last game of the season, McGeady was sent off for a late challenge on Marcin Kowalczyk in the derby against Dynamo Moscow. He was included in the Russian Football Union's list of 33 top players, published in December 2010, placing McGeady as second best right winger.

The 2011–12 season started with McGeady scoring a late goal against FC Basel, putting Spartak through to the last 16 of the UEFA Europa League. In his first full season he made 31 appearances, scoring three times, but expressed a desire to leave the club once his contract ran out.

After starting the 2012–13 season by scoring in a 2–1 win over Volga, McGeady received his first red of that season, getting sent off in a 5–0 defeat to FC Zenit Saint Petersburg on 11 August 2012. Spartak were knocked out of the UEFA Champions League by McGeady's former club, Celtic. In May 2013, McGeady received a red card for the second time in the season after he struck an opponent, and then made an offensive gesture as he left the pitch. He was accused of vandalising a dressing room door at Saransk Stadium and was warned that he could face police action. Originally suspended for six matches, the Russian Football Union reduced his suspension to two matches. After serving the two match ban, he made his return in the last game of the season, where he provided an assist in a 2–0 win against Alania Vladikavkaz. At the end of the season, McGeady made 23 appearances and scored five times.

McGeady scored his first goal of 2013–14, also providing an assist, as Spartak won 2–0 against Ural Sverdlovsk Oblast. In September, he had a hat-trick of assists in a 3–2 win over Krasnodar, but he was disciplined, sent to train with the club's youth team, and was later placed on the transfer list after ignoring team orders. Despite being disciplined, manager Valeri Karpin said that McGeady could make it back to the first team.

Everton 

In January 2014, McGeady joined English club Everton of the Premier League on a four-and-a-half-year contract for an undisclosed fee. He made his debut by coming on as a substitute in a 1–1 draw away to West Bromwich Albion. McGeady was mainly used as a substitute as he made just three starts in his first season, helping Everton to record their best ever points tally in the Premier League era of 72 to finish fifth.

McGeady scored his first goal for Everton on 16 August 2014, curling in the ball in off the post in a 2–2 draw with Leicester City on the opening day of the 2014–15 Premier League season. The strike was nominated for Match of the Days Goal of the Month. A knee injury in January 2015 saw McGeady lose his place in the team to Aaron Lennon who signed for Everton during the transfer window that same month. McGeady only featured twice for Everton for the rest of the season, making two late second-half substitute appearances in May 2015.

The start of the following season saw McGeady completely frozen out of the Everton first team. By November 2015 he had made only one appearance, in a League Cup tie against Barnsley on 26 August, and even then he was taken off at half-time. McGeady was not assigned a squad number for the 2016–17 season.

Sheffield Wednesday (loan)
On 1 February 2016, McGeady signed for Sheffield Wednesday on loan for the remainder of the 2015–16 season, with manager Carlos Carvalhal stating that he had attempted to sign McGeady while managing Sporting Lisbon. McGeady scored his first goal for Sheffield Wednesday in a 3–0 win at Nottingham Forest on 12 March 2016. McGeady was left out of Carvalhal's squads for both legs of the playoff semi-final against Brighton and the playoff final against Hull after a series of poor performances.

Preston North End (loan)
On 31 August 2016, McGeady signed for Preston North End on a season-long loan. Playing regularly appeared to help McGeady recover some of his best form and he was awarded the Championship Player of the Month for February after scoring three goals and providing four assists. His 25-yard strike against Huddersfield Town was nominated for Championship Goal of the Month for April, but Sebastien Pocognoli won it. After scoring eight goals in 35 appearances during his stint at Deepdale, he was named as Preston's player of the year.

Sunderland
McGeady signed a three-year contract with Sunderland on 13 July 2017, reuniting him with former Preston manager Simon Grayson. He made his debut on 4 August 2017, in a 1–1 draw with Derby County. McGeady scored his first goal for Sunderland the following weekend on 13 August 2017 in a 3–1 victory at Norwich City with a "superb strike" from 20 yards, then set up Lewis Grabban for his second goal and Sunderland's third with a cross.

He was nominated for League One Player of the Month twice in 2018–19, winning the award for February. His performances saw him recognized by his peers as he made Team of the Year and was shortlisted for Player of the Year in League One. Luton Town's James Collins won the individual accolade. McGeady was voted the Supporters Player of the Year though.

In July 2019 he signed a one-year contract extension with the club. However, following speculation regarding his future at the club due to off field incidents, manager Phil Parkinson announced on 12 December 2019 that he had told McGeady that he has no future at the club.

Following this announcement, McGeady joined Charlton Athletic on loan for the rest of the 2019–20 season on 31 January 2020. On 20 June 2020, this was further extended, due to the extension of the Championship season.

McGeady made his first Sunderland appearance in over a year under new head coach Lee Johnson, playing 77 minutes in a 1–0 home defeat to Wigan Athletic on 6 December 2020. On 13 February 2021, McGeady was part of the team that won 4–1 against promotion rivals Doncaster Rovers, with him providing all 4 assists to Sunderland's goals - all of which were scored by teammate Charlie Wyke. By the end of the Rovers match, McGeady had recorded eight assists in his first 12 games since his return. He and Wyke were shortlisted for February's Player of the Month in the league. 

Following an impressive 2020–21 season, McGeady was named in the 2020–21 EFL League One Team of the Season at the league's annual awards ceremony. Following promotion through the play-offs at the end of the 2021–22 season, McGeady was released after five years at the club.

Hibernian
McGeady signed a one-year contract with Scottish club Hibernian on 24 June 2022, reuniting him with former Sunderland manager Lee Johnson. McGeady made 4 Scottish League Cup appearances for the club in July but an ankle injury he sustained kept him out of action for a long term spell. He returned to action in December, but then suffered a hamstring injury on 18 February 2023 in a game against Kilmarnock. It was later confirmed that the injury would prevent him from playing for the rest of the 2022–23 season, with the injury set to keep him out for four to six months.

International career
McGeady played for Scotland Schools while at Queen's Park. He played in an under-13 World Cup tournament in Paris. After Queen's Park he joined Celtic, who had a policy of not permitting their youths to play for their school teams due to conflicting kick off times. Scotland had a rule which would not permit a player who did not play for their school team to be considered for a call-up to Scotland Schools' selects.

The Republic of Ireland had no such rule preventing a player from being selected and instructed Donegal-born former Celtic player Packie Bonner, who knew of McGeady's Irish heritage, to invite McGeady to play for the Republic of Ireland Under-15 Schoolboys team. McGeady qualifies for Ireland through his paternal grandparents, who hail from the Gaeltacht area of Gweedore, County Donegal. McGeady accepted the offer and joined the Irish youth setup. McGeady was later named in a Scotland under-16 squad but declined the invitation, citing his experience of the Irish set-up, despite attempts to persuade him to do so by Scotland head coach Berti Vogts.

McGeady made his full debut for the Republic of Ireland in July 2004 against Jamaica. He has made over 90 appearances for Ireland and featured often under manager Giovanni Trapattoni, appearing in each of his squads. However, he lost his place in the starting line-up during the 2010 World Cup qualifiers.

On 26 March 2011, McGeady scored his first goal for Ireland in the Aviva Stadium against Macedonia in Euro 2012 qualifier, with Ireland winning 2–1. On 7 October 2011, McGeady scored his second international goal against Andorra thanks to a deflection off the Andorra defender to make the game 2–0. In the first leg of the UEFA Euro 2012 play-off against Estonia, McGeady provided the assist for the first goal when his cross found the head of Keith Andrews who scored. The game finished 4–0 to Ireland.

McGeady was named in Trapattoni's 23-man squad for the 2012 European Championships in Poland and Ukraine. McGeady set up Ireland's first and only goal of the tournament from a free-kick, converted by Leicester City's Sean St Ledger in the 3–1 defeat to Croatia.

In Martin O'Neill's first game as Irish manager, he scored his first international goal for over two years in a 3–0 win over Latvia. In September 2014, McGeady scored both of Ireland's goals against Georgia in a 2–1 away victory in the opening game of the Euro 2016 qualifiers. Despite having made only 13 appearances at club level in the preceding season, he was selected for the Ireland squad for the finals tournament, and appeared as a substitute in each of the three group games (a draw with Sweden, a defeat to Belgium and a win over Italy).

McGeady was shortlisted for FAI Senior International Player of the Year in 2014, but lost out to John O'Shea.

Style of play
A two-footed player, McGeady is known for his speed, skill, and creativity with the ball on the wing, as well as his dribbling skills, technique, close control, ball playing ability, and use of feints and trickery in possession. When facing opponents in one on one situations, he is known for using a variation upon the marseille turn (popularised by Zinedine Zidane), which includes him dragging the ball with his right foot behind his standing foot – instead of to the side – during the first phase of the move, in a similar manner to the Cruyff Turn. The third phase also sees him using the outside of his left boot to move the ball in instead of the sole. This trademark move of his has come to be known as the McGeady Spin in his honour, and has been included in EA Sports' FIFA video game series.

Career statistics
Club

International

Scores and results list the Republic of Ireland's goal tally first, score column indicates score after each McGeady goal.

HonoursCelticScottish Premier League: 2003–04, 2005–06, 2006–07, 2007–08
Scottish Cup: 2004–05, 2006–07
Scottish League Cup: 2008–09Sunderland EFL League One play-offs: 2022
EFL Trophy: 2020–21; runner-up: 2018–19Individual'
FAI Young International Player of the Year: 2008
PFA Scotland Players' Player of the Year: 2007–08
PFA Scotland Young Player of the Year: 2007–08
PFA Scotland Team of the Year (SPL): 2007–08, 2008–09
SPL Young Player of the Year: 2007–08
BBC Sportsound Player of the Year: 2007–08
Celtic FC Fans Player of the Year: 2007–08
Celtic FC Players' Player of the Year: 2007–08, 2009–10
Celtic FC Young Player of the Year: 2004–05, 2005–06, 2006–07
SPL Player of the Month: December 2004, November 2007, February 2008
SPL Young Player of the Month: March 2005, November 2005, August 2006, September 2006
Russian Football Union Top 33: 2010, 2011–12
FAI International Goal of the Year: 2014
Preston North End FC Player of the Year: 2016–17
EFL Championship Player of the Month: February 2017
PFA Team of the Year: 2018–19 League One, 2020–21 League One
Sunderland Player of the Year: 2018–19
Preston North End FC Team of the Decade: 2010–19
EFL League One Player of the Month: February 2019
EFL League One Team of the Season: 2020–21

See also
 List of Republic of Ireland international footballers born outside the Republic of Ireland

References

External links

Ireland profile at Soccerscene

1986 births
Living people
People from Thorntonhall
Footballers from Glasgow
Republic of Ireland association footballers
Republic of Ireland under-21 international footballers
Republic of Ireland international footballers
Scottish footballers
Scottish people of Irish descent
Association football wingers
Association football forwards
Expatriate footballers in Russia
Irish expatriates in Russia
Queen's Park F.C. players
Celtic F.C. players
FC Spartak Moscow players
Everton F.C. players
Sunderland A.F.C. players
Sheffield Wednesday F.C. players
Preston North End F.C. players
Charlton Athletic F.C. players
Hibernian F.C. players
Scottish Premier League players
Russian Premier League players
Premier League players
English Football League players
UEFA Euro 2012 players
UEFA Euro 2016 players
People educated at St Ninian's High School, Giffnock
Scottish expatriate footballers
Scottish expatriate sportspeople in Russia
Irish expatriate sportspeople in Russia
Scottish Professional Football League players